DXCL (1098 AM) Sonshine Radio is a radio station owned and operated by Sonshine Media Network International. The station's studio is located at Corrales Ave. cor. Ramon Chavez St., Cagayan de Oro. Formerly the callsign was used by 1960s under the hand of Chronicle Broadcasting Network (ABS-CBN) at the frequency of 700 kHz until 1972 when the martial law begin by Marcos at September 21.

References

Radio stations in Cagayan de Oro
Radio stations established in 1975
Sonshine Media Network International
News and talk radio stations in the Philippines